Dosapadu is a village in Eluru district of the Indian state of Andhra Pradesh. It is administered under the Eluru revenue division.

Demographics 

 Census of India, Dosapadu has population of 1870 of which 908 are males while 962 are females.  Average Sex Ratio is 1059. Population of children with age 0-6 is 202 which makes up 10.80% of total population of village, Child sex ratio is 1082. Literacy rate of the village was 73.50%.

References

Villages in Eluru district